At present, the capital city of Rome hosts 140 embassies for Italy. Several countries have ambassadors accredited to Italy, with most being resident in Brussels, London, or Paris.

This listing excludes honorary consulates, trade missions, and embassies to the Holy See.

Missions in Rome

Embassies

Permanent missions to the Food and Agriculture Organization

Other delegations or representative offices 
 (Representative Office)

 (Representative Office)
 (Mission of Palestine)
 (Representative Office)

Gallery

Consular missions

Bari

 (Consular office)
 (Consulate-General)

Catania
 (Consulate)

Bologna
 (Consulate)
 (Consulate)
 (Consulate-General)

Florence
 (Consulate-General)
 (Consulate-General)
 (Consulate-General)

Genoa

 (Consulate-General)
 (Consulate)
 (Consulate)

Milan

 (Consulate-General)

 (Consulate)

 (Consulate-General)

 (Consulate)

 (Consulate)

Naples

 (Consulate)

Padua

Palermo

 (Consulate)
 (Consular agency)

Trieste

 (Consulate-General)

Turin
 (Consulate)
 (Consulate-General)
 (Consulate-General)

Venice

 (Consular agency)

Verona

Non-resident embassies accredited to Italy 

Resident in Brussels, Belgium:

 
 
 
 
 
 
 
 
 

Resident in Paris, France

Resident in Geneva, Switzerland

 

 
 
 
 

Resident in other cities

 (Andorra la Vella)
 (St John's)
 (London)
 (Berlin)
 (London)
 (Madrid)
 (Lisbon)
 (Berlin)
 (Singapore)
 (London)

Closed missions

Embassies to the Holy See 

The Vatican City State, governed by the Holy See, does not possess sufficient territory to host diplomatic missions. Consequently, diplomatic missions accredited to the Holy See are based in Rome, Italy.

See also 
 Foreign relations of Italy
 List of diplomatic missions of Italy
 Visa requirements for Italian citizens

Notes

References 

 
Diplomatic missions
Italy